No Clue is a 2013 Canadian dark comedy film written by Brent Butt and directed by Carl Bessai, starring Butt, Amy Smart and David Koechner.

Plot
Advertising salesman Leo (Butt) unwittingly assumes the role of a private investigator to help Kyra (Smart), but becomes embroiled in a risky and ever-deepening murder mystery.

In Canada, a woman named Kyra goes to the office of the middle-aged clumsy salesman Leo Falloon by mistake believing that he is a private detective. She hires him to help her to find her missing brother Milles Severeign and Leo is so spellbound by the blonde that he does not tell her that he is not who she is looking for. Leo decides to pose as a private detective and he gets involved in a complicated scheme of fraud by computer game corporations.

Cast
 Brent Butt as Leo
 Amy Smart as Kyra
 David Koechner as Ernie
 David Cubitt as Horn
 Dan Payne as Church
 Dustin Milligan as Danny
 Kirsten Prout as Reese
 Garwin Sanford as Nelson
 Nancy Robertson as Phyllis
 Chelah Horsdal as Alice

Production
No Clue was filmed in Vancouver in July 2012.

Release
The first screening of No Clue was on 5 December 2013 at the Whistler Film Festival in British Columbia. Public screenings began in Vancouver on 6 March 2014, with the general Canadian release the following day.

Reception
The movie received mixed reviews from critics. It holds a 33% score on Rotten Tomatoes based on 6 reviews. Critics praised the acting of Brent Butt, Amy Smart, and David Koechner.

References

External links
 
 No Clue at Telefilm Canada

2013 films
English-language Canadian films
Canadian crime comedy films
Canadian comedy mystery films
Films shot in Vancouver
Films set in Vancouver
2010s comedy mystery films
2010s crime comedy films
2013 comedy films
2010s English-language films
2010s Canadian films